Columbia Turnpike-East Tollhouse (also known as the Hillsdale Toll House) is a 1799-built toll house along New York State Route 23 east of Mitchell Street and Mansfield Road in the Town of Hillsdale, New York. It operated along the Columbia Turnpike until 1907 when it was turned over to the county and then the state, which designated the road as New York State Route 23. The house served as a private residence until 1990. 

It was added to the National Register of Historic Places on June 23, 2016.

See also
Columbia Turnpike-West Tollhouse

References

External links
Hillsdale Toll House (William G. Pomeroy Foundation) 
Friends of East Gate (Preservation Group)

Houses on the National Register of Historic Places in New York (state)
Federal architecture in New York (state)
Houses in Columbia County, New York
Toll houses on the National Register of Historic Places
National Register of Historic Places in Columbia County, New York